Fadil Muriqi (Serbo-Croatian: Fadil Murići / Фадил Мурићи; born 17 November 1959) is a former Kosovar Albanian footballer who is best known for his time with FC Prishtina during the 1980s as part of the "Golden Generation".

Career

Prishtina
Muriqi began playing football in Yugoslav Second League club FK Budućnost Peć but, after only one season there, he moved to KF Pristina, where he played for five seasons in the Yugoslav First League from 1982 to 1988. He was nicknamed Maradona of Kosovo from the fans of Prishtina because of the similarity of the physique and playing style with the El Pibe de Oro.
Together with Fadil Vokrri and Kujtim Shala he led the team of FC Prishtina in their most successful years

NK Rijeka
In the 1989–90 season together with his younger brother Xhevdet, he moved to NK Rijeka and played there another season in the Yugoslav First League before moving to Australia.

Australia
Fadil Muriqi became the first ethnic Albanian footballer to play in the National Soccer League in Australia. He joined Sydney Croatia (today Sydney United) and played the 1991–92 season with them having 23 appearances and scoring 3 goals.
In the following season he moved to another Croatian Australian club, Canberra FC where he played for two seasons before joining the Albanian club of South Dandenong (Dandenong Thunder) helping them to get promoted up to Victorian State League Division 1. In 1997, he played for the Fawkner Blues in the Victorian Premier League and in the following season moved back to South Dandenong for their first ever season in the Victorian Premier League.

Family
Fadil Muriqi is married to Lumnije Muriqi and has three children. The eldest being Rinor Muriqi, the second eldest, Margarita Muriqi and the youngest Gentiana Muriqi.

External links
 Oz Football profile
 Stats from Yugoslav 1 and 2 leagues at Zerodic (temporarily dead link, the exact copy data is found on EX YU Fudbalska Statistika po godinama at B92)

1960 births
Living people
Sportspeople from Peja
Association football midfielders
Kosovan footballers
KF Besa players
FC Prishtina players
HNK Rijeka players
Sydney United 58 FC players
Dandenong Thunder SC players
Yugoslav First League players
National Soccer League (Australia) players
Kosovan expatriate footballers
Expatriate footballers in Croatia
Kosovan expatriate sportspeople in Croatia
Expatriate soccer players in Australia
Kosovan expatriate sportspeople in Australia
Kosovan football managers
FC Drita managers
FC Prishtina managers
Kosovan expatriate football managers
Expatriate soccer managers in Australia